Jayden Fairley (born 22 September 2003) is a Scottish footballer who plays for Armadale Thistle.

Club career
Fairley is a product of the Hibernian youth academy.  He had two loan spells at Civil Service Strollers during his time at Easter Road.  The midfield man made his football league debut during a loan spell at Stenhousemuir on 17 October 2020 in a 3–1 with away to Albion Rovers. He left the Hibees permanently in 2022.

He signed for Armadale Thistle in July 2022.

International career
Fairley has represented Scotland at U16 and U17 level.  He scored his first international goal for Scotland U17 in a 2–0 win over Armenia on 22 October 2019.

References

External links
Jayden Fairley on Soccerbase

2003 births
Scottish footballers
Hibernian F.C. players
Stenhousemuir F.C. players
Armadale Thistle players
Scottish Football League players
Living people
Association football forwards
Scotland youth international footballers
People from Stoneyburn
Footballers from West Lothian